The 2021 NCAA Division I Indoor Track and Field Championships were the 56th NCAA Division I Men's Indoor Track and Field Championships and the 39th NCAA Division I Women's Indoor Track and Field Championships, held at the Randal Tyson Track Center in Fayetteville, Arkansas near the campus of the host school, the University of Arkansas. In total, thirty-four different men's and women's indoor track and field events were contested from March 11 to March 13, 2021.

Because of the COVID-19 pandemic, the event was closed to the public.

Streaming and TV coverage
ESPN3 live streamed the championships. On March 14, a replay of the championships was broadcast at 9:00 PM Eastern Time on ESPNU.

Results

Men's results

60 meters
Final results shown, not prelims

200 meters
Final results shown, not prelims

400 meters
Final results shown, not prelims

800 meters
Final results shown, not prelims

Mile
Final results shown, not prelims

3000 meters
Final results shown, not prelims

5000 meters
Final results shown, not prelims

60 meter hurdles
Final results shown, not prelims

4 × 400 meters relay
Final results shown, not prelims

Distance medley relay
Final results shown, not prelims

High jump
Final results shown, not prelims

Pole vault
Final results shown, not prelims

Long jump
Final results shown, not prelims

Triple jump
Final results shown, not prelims

Shot put
Final results shown, not prelims

Weight throw
Final results shown, not prelims

Heptathlon
Final results shown, not prelims

Men's team scores
Top 10 and ties shown

Women's results

60 meters
Final results shown, not prelims

200 meters
Final results shown, not prelims

400 meters
Final results shown, not prelims

800 meters
Final results shown, not prelims

Mile
Final results shown, not prelims

3000 meters
Final results shown, not prelims

5000 meters
Final results shown, not prelims

60 meter hurdles
Final results shown, not prelims

4 × 400 meters relay
Final results shown, not prelims

Distance medley relay
Final results shown, not prelims

High jump
Final results shown, not prelims

Pole vault
Final results shown, not prelims

Long jump
Final results shown, not prelims

Triple jump
Final results shown, not prelims

Shot put
Final results shown, not prelims

Weight throw
Final results shown, not prelims

Pentathlon
Final results shown, not prelims

Women's team scores
Top 10 and ties shown

See also
National Collegiate Athletic Association (NCAA)
NCAA Men's Division I Indoor Track and Field Championships 
NCAA Women's Division I Indoor Track and Field Championships
2021 NCAA Division I Outdoor Track and Field Championships

References

External links
Schedule
Full results

NCAA Division I Indoor Track and Field Championships
NCAA Indoor Track and Field Championships
NCAA Division I Indoor Track and Field Championships
NCAA Division I Indoor Track and Field Championships
College sports in Arkansas
NCAA Division I Indoor Track and Field Championships